The Mitsubishi Ka-12 or B4M was a Japanese carrier-based torpedo bomber of 1934. Two prototypes  were built by Mitsubishi for the Imperial Japanese Navy. A development of the company's 3MT10 of 1932, the design differed primarily in the use of a radial engine and metal wing, which made the whole aircraft significantly lighter and faster. However, the design could not realise its potential as the wing was inefficiently stiff and the B4M was not selected for production. The competing Yokosuka B4Y was chosen to serve on the Navy's aircraft carriers instead.

Design and development
In 1933, the Japanese Navy still relied on the Mitsubishi B1M as the backbone of its carrier-borne attack force. The Yokosuka B3Y was starting to enter service, developed in response to the 7-shi, competition. However, already, the new aircraft was suffering engine reliability and other problems, and an early replacement was deemed expedient. The B3Y had seen off competition from Mitsubishi and Nakajima, and both were invited, along with Yokosuka, to enter a design to the ensuing 9-shi competition in February 1934.

In response, Mitsubishi submitted a design based on their unsuccessful 7-shi entry, the 3MT10. However, instead of the bulky Rolls-Royce Buzzard V-12, a less powerful but lighter experimental Mitsubishi 8-Shi radial engine was fitted. Weight-saving measures included introducing aluminium wings and removing the wheel fairings.

Matsuhara's final Ka-12 design was a single bay biplane of composite construction, with a fabric covered wooden frame fuselage and metal upper wings. The lower wings were of a new inverse gull shape, with fixed undercarriage attached to the wing and fuselage. The undercarriage had a wide track to allow for the carriage of a single  torpedo or the equivalent weight in free-fall bombs. The three crew were seated in open cockpits and shared a total of three  machine guns, two mounted on flexible mounts firing aft and a single fixed mounting firing forward.

Operational history
The first prototype was completed and first flew in August 1934. The aircraft was designated B4M1 by the Navy and flown against designs from both Nakajima and Yokosuka. Performance was considered superior to the aircraft in service, but the aircraft was unstable and difficult to fly. The lack of stiffness in the aluminium wing caused problems and the aircraft could not safely fly at its theoretical maximum speed. A second prototype designated was built with design changes, including a new nose fairing for the engine and a tailwheel instead of a skid, but these did not solve all the problems. The Navy rejected the design and the competing Yokosuka B4Y was chosen for production instead. However, Mitsubishi did gain some consolation from the outcome as they eventually produced 135 of the Yokosuka type.

Operators

 Imperial Japanese Navy

Specifications (B4M1)

See also

References

Citations

Bibliography
 
 

1930s Japanese bomber aircraft
Aircraft first flown in 1934
Biplanes
Carrier-based aircraft
B4M
Single-engined tractor aircraft